Sülz is a neighborhood of the city of Cologne, Germany.

Sülz may also refer to:

 Sülz (river), a small river in North Rhine-Westphalia, Germany
 Sülz (Silesia), a village in Silesia

See also 
 Sulz (disambiguation)